Lars Forster (born 1 August 1993) is a Swiss cyclo-cross and cross-country mountain biker. He represented his nation in the men's elite race at the 2016 UCI Cyclo-cross World Championships  in Heusden-Zolder, and in the men's cross-country race at the 2016 Summer Olympics in Rio de Janeiro. He was on the start list for the 2018 Cross-country European Championship and he finished 1st.

Major results

Cyclo-cross

2009–2010
 1st  National Junior Championships
2010–2011
 1st  UEC European Junior Championships
 1st  National Junior Championships
 1st Junior Aigle
 3rd Overall UCI Junior World Cup
1st Heusden-Zolder
2011–2012
 2nd National Under-23 Championships
2012–2013
 1st  National Under-23 Championships
2013–2014
 1st  National Under-23 Championships
2015–2016
 1st  National Championships
 2nd Luzern
 EKZ CrossTour
3rd Meilen
 3rd Sion-Valais
2016–2017
 1st Dagmersellen
 2nd National Championships
 EKZ CrossTour
2nd Meilen
2017–2018
 1st  National Championships
 1st Madiswil
 1st Dagmersellen
2018–2019
 2nd Overall EKZ CrossTour
1st Eschenbach
2nd Meilen
 2nd Luzern
 3rd National Championships
2019–2020
 1st  National Championships
 2nd Madiswil
 EKZ CrossTour
3rd Meilen
2020–2021
 2nd National Championships
 3rd Overall EKZ CrossTour
1st Baden
3rd Hittnau
2021–2022
 2nd Meilen

Mountain Bike

2011
 2nd  Team relay, UCI World Championships
 2nd  Team relay, UEC European Championships
2014
 1st  Cross-country, National Under-23 Championships
2016
 1st  Team relay, UEC European Championships
 3rd  Team relay, UCI World Championships
2018
 1st  Cross-country, UEC European Championships
2019
 1st  Overall Cape Epic (with Nino Schurter)
 UCI XCO World Cup
1st Snowshoe
 Swiss Bike Cup
1st Basel
3rd Andermatt
3rd Lugano
3rd Solothurn
 Internazionali d'Italia Series
1st San Marino
 UCI XCC World Cup
2nd Albstadt
2020
 1st  Overall Swiss Epic (with Nino Schurter)
 3rd Cross-country, National Championships
2021
 1st  Cross-country, UEC European Championships
 Swiss Bike Cup
1st Savognin
2nd Basel
3rd Gränichen
 Internazionali d’Italia Series
1st Andora
2022
 Internazionali d’Italia Series
1st San Zeno di Montagna
 Swiss Bike Cup
2nd Basel

References

External links
 

1993 births
Living people
Cyclo-cross cyclists
Swiss male cyclists
Place of birth missing (living people)
Olympic cyclists of Switzerland
Cyclists at the 2016 Summer Olympics
Cape Epic winners
Swiss mountain bikers
People from Locarno
Sportspeople from Ticino